Fan Weijun (born 20 November 1978), is a former Chinese-born Hong Kong professional football player. He was capable of playing at all outfield positions.

On 3 July 2014, Fan was charged with conspiracy to defraud in relation to a Senior Shield match the prior season. Later, on 24 September, he was acquitted by the Eastern Court.

Career statistics

Club
As of 14 May 2008

References

External links
 

1978 births
Living people
Chinese footballers
Hong Kong footballers
Footballers from Shanghai
Beijing Renhe F.C. players
Sichuan Guancheng players
Chinese Super League players
China League One players
Expatriate footballers in Hong Kong
Chinese expatriate sportspeople in Hong Kong
Hong Kong First Division League players
South China AA players
Hong Kong Rangers FC players
Happy Valley AA players
Association football utility players
Hong Kong League XI representative players